Christoph Dabrowski (born Krzysztof Dąbrowski; 1 August 1978) is a German football manager and former player who manages Rot-Weiss Essen. He played for Werder Bremen, Arminia Bielefeld, Hannover 96 and VfL Bochum.

Club career
On 11 May 1999, Dabrowski scored the decisive goal in Werder Bremen's 1–0 win against Schalke 04 and greatly contributed to the club's Bundesliga survival. It was also the first match with manager Thomas Schaaf in charge of the team. Shortly afterwards he helped them win the 1998–99 DFB-Pokal, starting in the final against Bayern Munich as Bremen won on penalties.

International career
Of Polish descent, Dabrowski owns dual German-Polish citizenship and in October 2005 the Polish Football Association requested to nominate Dabrowski for their national team. However, the FIFA rejected the request because Dabrowski was not entitled to play for Poland, as he had already played for the German Team 2006.

Managerial career
On 10 October 2013, Dabrowski was named as the new assistant manager of Hannover 96's reserve team, Hannover 96 II. He left this position on 28 January 2014, and was picked as the new manager of the U17 team of Hannover 96.

On 11 June 2015, Dabrowski was named as the new assistant coach of Hannover 96 under manager Michael Frontzeck.

On 1 December 2021, Dabrowski was announced as interim coach of Hannover 96 after Jan Zimmermann was sacked. The appointment was made permanent on 21 December 2021, after the team had won two out of three matches under Dabrowski; he received a contract until the end of the season. After the 2021–22 season he left Hannover. In June 2022, he was appointed by Rot-Weiss Essen.

Personal life
Dabrowski was born in Katowice and emigrated in the age of six years with his mother as an ethnic German (Aussiedler) – his maternal grandfather had served in the German Wehrmacht and therefore got an Aussiedler status – from his country of birth and settled in West-Berlin.

Career statistics

Managerial statistics

References

External links

1978 births
Living people
Sportspeople from Katowice
German footballers
German football managers
Germany under-21 international footballers
Germany B international footballers
Polish footballers
Polish football managers
German people of Polish descent
Polish people of German descent
Polish emigrants to Germany
Citizens of Germany through descent
SV Werder Bremen players
SV Werder Bremen II players
Arminia Bielefeld players
Hannover 96 players
VfL Bochum players
VfL Bochum II players
Bundesliga players
2. Bundesliga players
Association football midfielders
Hannover 96 managers
Rot-Weiss Essen managers
2. Bundesliga managers
3. Liga managers
Footballers from Berlin